This is a listing of the horses that finished in either first, second, or third place and the number of starters in the Forward Gal Stakes, an American Grade 2 race for three-year-old fillies at 7 furlongs on dirt held at Gulfstream Park in
Hallandale Beach, Florida.  (List 1981-present)

A # designates that the race was run in two divisions in 1982.

References

External links 
 The 2009 Forward Gal Stakes at the NTRA

Gulfstream Park